Rrapo Taho (born 17 August 1959) is an Albanian retired football central defender.

Club career
Taho spent his entire career with hometown club Flamurtari during the 1970s and 1980s, during the club's golden years alongside fellow international players like Sokol Kushta, Kreshnik Çipi, Petro Ruçi, Alfred Ferko and Alfred Zijai. His most notable goal was scored in a game against FK Partizan, which helped qualify Flamurtari for the UEFA Cup in the 1987–1988 season. That same season, Flamurtari had beaten FC Barcelona in the away game, but lost in the return, therefore getting disqualified.

International career
He made his debut for Albania in an October 1986 European Championship qualification match against Austria and earned a total of 11 caps, scoring no goals. His final international was an April 1993 FIFA World Cup qualification match against Lithuania.

Personal life
His son, Rexhino Taho is also a footballer, having also played for Flamurtari.

Honours
Albanian Superliga: 1
 1991

Albanian Cup: 2
 1985, 1988

References

External links

1959 births
Living people
Footballers from Vlorë
Albanian footballers
Association football central defenders
Albania international footballers
Flamurtari Vlorë players
Kategoria Superiore players